Chonelasmatinae is a subfamily of sea sponge in the family Euretidae.

Species 
According to the World Register of Marine Species, the following species are accepted within Chonelasmatinae:

 Bathyxiphus Schulze, 1899
 Chonelasma Schulze, 1886
 Periphragella Marshall, 1875
 Pinulasma Reiswig & Stone, 2013
 Pleurochorium Schrammen, 1912
 Tretochone Reid, 1958
 Verrucocoeloidea Reid, 1969

References 

Hexactinellida
Sponge subfamilies